This page lists the World Best Year Performance in the year 1999 in both the men's and the women's hammer throw. The main event during this season were the 1999 World Athletics Championships in Seville, Spain, where the final of the men's competition was held on Sunday August 22, 1999. The women had their final two days later, on Tuesday August 24, 1999.

Men

Records

1999 World Year Ranking

Women

Records

1999 World Year Ranking

References
 tilastopaja 
 apulanta
 apulanta
 digilander.libero
 IAAF
 hammerthrow.wz

1999
Hammer Throw Year Ranking, 1999